Matteo Ferrari (born 12 February 1997 in Cesena) is an Italian motorcycle racer. He currently competes in the FIM MotoE World Cup aboard an Energica Ego Corsa.

Career statistics

Italian Superbike Championship (CIV)

Races by year
(key)

Grand Prix motorcycle racing

By season

By class

Races by year
(key) (Races in bold indicate pole position, races in italics indicate fastest lap)

 Half points awarded as less than two thirds of the race distance (but at least three full laps) was completed.

Superbike World Championship

Races by year
(key) (Races in bold indicate pole position, races in italics indicate fastest lap)

References

External links

1997 births
Living people
Italian motorcycle racers
Moto3 World Championship riders
FIM Superstock 1000 Cup riders
MotoE World Cup riders
Superbike World Championship riders